Swing Lo Magellan is the sixth studio album by American experimental rock group Dirty Projectors, which was released on Domino Records on July 10, 2012 in the United States and July 9, 2012 internationally.

Recording

Album cover
The album cover features Dave Longstreth and Amber Coffman talking to one of their neighbors in Upstate New York, where Swing Lo Magellan was recorded. The photo was taken by Dave Longstreth's brother.

Production
The album was written, recorded, produced and mixed by Dirty Projectors frontman Dave Longstreth in Delaware County, New York. Swing Lo Magellan recording sessions spanned a year and resulted in around 40 demos. The album was not recorded with Angel Deradoorian, who left the band.

Longstreth wanted Swing Lo Magellan to be a collection of individual songs instead of an album united by a single theme, unlike with previous albums. In addition, Longstreth sought to write more personal songs.

Style and influences
Swing Lo Magellan has been described as more "beats-driven" and more accessible than previous Dirty Projectors albums. For specific influences, critics and Longstreth himself have cited a variety of influences, ranging from popular music acts such as Nirvana, Lil Wayne, Michael Jackson, Neil Young, En Vogue and Blind Willie Johnson to classical music composers such as Arnold Schoenberg and György Ligeti.

Release
Swing Lo Magellans first single, "Gun Has No Trigger", was released on March 30, 2012 and was selected as a Best New Track by Pitchfork Media on April 2. On June 8, 2012, a music video for "Gun Has No Trigger" was released. The music video was visually influenced by Apple Inc.'s iPod commercials and by the default profile images used on Facebook and Gmail. On June 14, 2012, a second song from the album, "Dance for You," was released online. Swing Lo Magellan was streamed in its entirety on July 2, 2012.

A film featuring music from Swing Lo Magellan, titled Hi Custodian, was released on September 7, 2012. The film, which features band members inhabiting a variety of characters in a surreal narrative about spiritual death and rebirth, was directed by Longstreth and was influenced by Runaway and Purple Rain.

The album peaked at #22 on the Billboard 200 and #2 on the Independent Albums chart.

Reception

Swing Lo Magellan received general acclaim from music critics. At Metacritic, which assigns a normalized rating out of 100 to reviews from mainstream critics, the album received an average score of 80, based on 41 reviews, indicating "Generally favorable reviews".

Spin'''s Dan Weiss called Swing Lo Magellan "The Dirty Projectors' best album by a mile," describing the album as "[..] all magnificent wobble, no collapse." Weiss also praised the female vocals, writing "[..] the female singers [..] buttress Longstreth, rather than rescuing him from the car wreck of his own voice." Chris Mincher of The A.V. Club gave the album a grade of A−, writing "But where Longstreth’s quirks have often felt carefully calculated, here they come off as spontaneous improvisations or even mistakes. This relaxed, informal execution makes Swing Lo Magellan seem vulnerable, imperfect, and earnestly human. By easing off on all the wizardry—as impressive as it is—Longstreth creates room to actually feel something." Pitchforks Grayson Currin gave the album a Best New Music designation, writing "The band's least ornate batch of songs to date builds upon Longstreth's most direct and identifiable lyrics ever. Which means that Dirty Projectors have upped their emotional and structural accessibility all at once." Alex Niven of The Quietus described the album as "strikingly warm, organic, and intricately drawn" and noted the "basic primal glee in encountering Longstreth's psychedelic neologisms as they crop up". Thomas May of musicOMH also praised the album, writing "Swing Lo Magellan affords generous breathing space to Dirty Projectors' music: a context in which new levels of unpretentious eloquence positively flourish."

Not all critics were entirely positive towards the album. Entertainment Weeklys Darren Franich wrote "It [Swing Lo Magellan] should be thrillingly anarchic; instead, it just meanders." Aneet Nijjar of AllMusic acknowledged that some listeners might find the band's "rather knowing idiosyncrasy" to be "off-putting and smug." Blurt wrote that while Swing Lo Magellan was "instantly likeable,"  the album "unravels into nonsense and complexity on second glance." Alex Wilson of Tiny Mix Tapes did not find the album engaging and  criticized the music's inability to match the ideas behind the album. Wilson concluded: "Simply put, the music on Swing Lo can’t support its great ideas. [..] Maybe time will prove me completely and utterly wrong, but as far as I can tell, nothing on Swing Lo walks by itself."

Accolades
On 5 December 2012, Swing Lo Magellan'' was nominated for Best Recording Package at the 55th Grammy Awards. On December 20, 2012, Pitchfork Media ranked the album #15 on its list of the top 50 albums of 2012, writing: "For some bands, maturity means getting softer. For bands as talented and skeptical of routine as this one, it means getting better."  The album also placed #50 on Rolling Stone's list of the top 50 albums of 2012.  The album was listed 10th on Stereogum's list of top 50 albums of 2012.

Track listing

Bonus 7" Single 

Early versions of the 'Deluxe Limited Edition First Pressing' of the album sold at some Independent Music stores in the UK included a 7" vinyl single containing two tracks not included on the album. The record was also available for free at all U.S. shows on its summer tour. Its Domino Records catalog number is DNO1012.

 Side A: "Buckle Up"
 Side B: "Desire To Love"

Personnel

Dirty Projectors
David Longstreth
Amber Coffman
Nat Baldwin
Brian McOmber
Haley Dekle

Additional Musicians
Music:
Rob Moose - violin (2, 6, 9 and 11)
Nadia Sirota - viola (2, 6, 9 and 11)
Clarince Jensen - cello (2, 6, 9 and 11)
Alex Sopp - flutes (2, 6, 9 and 11)
Hideaki Aomori - clarinets, saxophone (2, 6, 9 and 11)
CJ Camerieri - trumpet, horn (2, 6, 9 and 11)

Recording personnel
David Longstreth - producer, arranger, mixing
Donato Paternostro - engineering, additional mixing (6, 7, 8 and 10)
Carl Barc - additional mixing (6, 7, 8 and 10)
Bob Ludwig - mastering

Artwork
Jake Longstreth - cover photograph
David Longstreth - art direction, design
Rob Carmichael - design

Charts

References

External links
Domino Records' page on Swing Lo Magellan

2012 albums
Domino Recording Company albums
Dirty Projectors albums
Albums produced by David Longstreth